Greenfield School, Greenfields school, or Green Fields School may refer to:

Primary schools 
Greenfield Park Primary International School, Quebec
Greenfields School, East Sussex, England

Secondary schools 
Greenfield High School (California), Greenfield, California
Greenfield High School (Illinois), Greenfield, Illinois
Greenfield High School (Massachusetts)
Greenfield High School (Missouri), a public high school in Greenfield, Missouri, United States
Greenfield School (North Carolina), a private pre-K–12 school in Wilson, North Carolina
Greenfield High School (Wisconsin)
Greenfield-Central High School, Indiana
Greenfield High School, a former school merged into Nodaway Valley High School

K-12 schools 
Green Fields School, Tucson, Arizona

Historical school buildings 
If the article is primarily on the school as an institution list it above, even if it is no longer a school.
Greenfield School (Greenfield, Indiana), an historic building in Hancock County, Indiana
Greenfield Elementary School (Pittsburgh, Pennsylvania)
Greenfield School (West Allis, Wisconsin)

See also
Greenfield Community College (disambiguation)
Greenfield (disambiguation)